Jesús Alejandro Cruz Gutiérrez (born 26 November 1951) is a Mexican politician from the Institutional Revolutionary Party. From 2000 to 2003 he served as Deputy of the LVIII Legislature of the Mexican Congress representing Chiapas. Previously, he served in the LV and LVIII Legislatures of the Congress of Chiapas.

References

1951 births
Living people
Politicians from Chiapas
Institutional Revolutionary Party politicians
20th-century Mexican politicians
21st-century Mexican politicians
People from Jiquipilas
Autonomous University of Chiapas alumni
Members of the Congress of Chiapas
Deputies of the LVIII Legislature of Mexico
Members of the Chamber of Deputies (Mexico) for Chiapas